Francis Ingram-Seymour-Conway, 2nd Marquess of Hertford, KG, PC, PC (Ire) (12 February 1743 – 17 June 1822), styled The Honourable Francis Seymour-Conway until 1750, Viscount Beauchamp between 1750 and 1793, and Earl of Yarmouth between 1793 and 1794, was a British peer and politician. He held seats in the Irish House of Commons from 1761 to 1776 and in the British House of Commons from 1766 to 1794. He served as Chief Secretary for Ireland under his father. He subsequently held positions in the Royal Household, including serving as Lord Chamberlain between 1812 and 1822.

Background and education
A member of the Seymour family headed by the Duke of Somerset, Hertford was the eldest son of Francis Seymour-Conway, 1st Marquess of Hertford, and Lady Isabella Fitzroy, daughter of Charles FitzRoy, 2nd Duke of Grafton, born on 12 January 1743 in London. He was the elder brother of Lord Robert Seymour and Lord Hugh Seymour. He was educated at Eton and Christ Church, Oxford.

Political career
In 1761, Hertford entered the Irish House of Commons for Lisburn, and later represented Antrim County between 1768 and 1776. He was sworn of the Irish Privy Council in 1775, and served as Chief Secretary for Ireland between 1765 and 1766 to the Lord Lieutenant of Ireland, his father. In 1766, he entered the British House of Commons as Member of Parliament for Lostwithiel, changing in 1768 to represent Orford until he succeeded his father in 1794. 

In 1783, Hertford was defied by his tenants in Lisburn. They elected Todd Jones, a captain in the Irish Volunteer movement, on a platform calling for the independence and reform of the Irish parliament. In 1790, with Jones arguing that reform was impossible without Catholic Emancipaton, Hertford's nominees regained parliamentary control of the borough.  

Hertford was himself sympathetic to the case for Catholic "relief" (in May 1778 he declared himself strongly in favour of the repeal of the penal acts affecting Roman Catholics) and in "A Letter to the First Company of Belfast Volunteers", published in Dublin, 1782, he endorsed the case for Ireland's legislative independence. He did not, however, embrace the call for parliamentary reform (abolition of the proprietary boroughs and a broader franchise) and he was averse to any further assertion of Irish independence.

Hertford served under Lord North, firstly as a Lord of the Treasury from 1774, and then from 1780 as Cofferer of the Household, a post he held until its abolishment in 1782. In 1780 he was also sworn of the British Privy Council. He remained out of office until 1804, when he was made Master of the Horse by William Pitt the Younger. He continued in this position until Pitt's death in 1806 and later served under Spencer Perceval and Lord Liverpool as Lord Chamberlain of the Household between 1812 and 1821.

Apart from his political career Hertford was also Lord Lieutenant of Warwickshire between 1816 and 1822, and Governor of County Antrim. In 1807 he was appointed a Knight of the Garter. 

Shortly before his death, he was refused a dukedom by Lord Liverpool. In 1829, he ordered MPs beholden to him to vote for the Roman Catholic Relief Act which finally removed the Protestant monopoly on Parliament.

Family

Lord Hertford married, firstly, the Hon. Alice Elizabeth Windsor, daughter of Herbert Windsor, 2nd Viscount Windsor, on 4 February 1768. After her death in 1772 he married, secondly, the Hon. Isabella Anne Ingram, daughter of Charles Ingram, 9th Viscount of Irvine and Frances Shepherd, on 20 May 1776. She was a mistress of George IV. On the death of his mother-in-law in 1807, he and his wife added the surname Ingram to their own, due to the fortune they inherited from her. Lord Hertford died in London in June 1822, aged 79, and was succeeded by his son from his second marriage, Francis. The Marchioness of Hertford died in April 1834.

References

External links

1743 births
1822 deaths
British MPs 1761–1768
British MPs 1768–1774
British MPs 1774–1780
British MPs 1780–1784
British MPs 1784–1790
British MPs 1790–1796
Francis Ingram-Seymour-Conway
Irish MPs 1727–1760
Irish MPs 1761–1768
Irish MPs 1769–1776
Knights of the Garter
Lord-Lieutenants of Warwickshire
Beauchamp, Francis Seymour-Conway, Viscount
Members of the Parliament of Ireland (pre-1801) for County Antrim constituencies
Members of the Privy Council of Great Britain
Members of the Privy Council of Ireland
Members of the Parliament of Great Britain for constituencies in Cornwall
People educated at Eton College
Alumni of Christ Church, Oxford
Chief Secretaries for Ireland
2